Denis McFadden (born 1946) is an Australian hairdresser-turned-businessman and entrepreneur. He is the founder, chief executive officer and franchisor of Just Cuts, a hairdressing franchise company based in Australia.

McFadden is a member of the Franchise Council of Australia's Hall of Fame, which honours outstanding performers in the franchising industry.

Career 
McFadden completed his hairdressing apprenticeship with a Sydney hairdresser before moving to London where he opened his first salon in the Marble Arch area, at the top of Oxford Street in the '60s.

In the late ‘70s, McFadden returned to his native Australia, opening a hairdressing salon in Sydney. In 1983, he spotted a gap in the market for quality, well-priced haircuts with no need to make appoints and Just Cuts was born.

The first Just Cuts franchise was opened in 1990 and, as of October 2017, there are 200 Just Cuts salons across Australia and New Zealand. In 2017, the company's annual revenue was reported to be $106m, placing the company at number 436 of The Australian Financial Review’s Top 500 Private Companies of Australia.

Television and Book Contributions 
In 2010, McFadden was one of the millionaires who featured on The Secret Millionaire Australia, a reality television show which aired on the Nine Network. The same year, McFadden featured in the book by Nick Gardner, How I made My First Million, 26 Self-made Millionaires Reveal the Secrets to Their Success, a collection of stories of ordinary men and women who turned a simple idea into a successful business.

Recognition 
McFadden served on the board of the Franchise Council of Australia in the ‘90s and was the president of the New South Wales chapter for two years. And in 2013, he was inducted into the Franchise Council of Australia's Hall of Fame which honours the franchising sector's outstanding performers

References 

Australian company founders
1946 births
Living people
Australian hairdressers